Charlotte Rich, Countess of Warwick (1680–1731), formerly Lady Charlotte Myddelton, was an English noblewoman. She was the wife of Edward Rich, 6th Earl of Warwick. Her second husband was the satirist Joseph Addison.

Charlotte Myddelton was the daughter of Sir Thomas Myddelton, 2nd Baronet, of Chirk Castle, and his wife Charlotte (died 1694), herself the daughter of Sir Orlando Bridgeman, 1st Baronet, of Great Lever. She married Edward Rich in February 1697, and he died in 1701. Their only son was Edward Rich, 7th Earl of Warwick (1698–1721).

In 1716, she married Joseph Addison, who shortly afterwards became Secretary of State for the Southern Department. They had one daughter, Charlotte (died 1797), who inherited their home at Bilton Hall. In a biography of Addison, Samuel Johnson claimed that his wife treated him like a slave. Addison died in 1719.

The dowager countess was buried on 12 July 1731, alongside her first husband, at St Mary Abbots, Kensington. A portrait of her by Herman van der Myn, dating from around 1726, is held by the National Trust at Chirk Castle.

References

1680 births
1731 deaths
English countesses